Domestic Disturbance is a 2001 American psychological thriller film directed by Harold Becker and starring John Travolta, Vince Vaughn, Teri Polo, Steve Buscemi, and Matt O'Leary.

Plot
In Southport, Maryland, Susan Morrison, recently divorced from her husband Frank, a struggling boat builder, is marrying a younger and wealthier man, Rick Barnes. Danny, Susan and Frank's twelve-year-old son, is clearly unhappy that his mother is remarrying. Susan asks Frank to allow Rick to go sailing with him and Danny, to help Danny bond with and accept Rick as a stepfather.

After the wedding, Danny and Rick play a game of catch, where Rick clearly becomes agitated with Danny's ambivalent playing style and starts criticizing him harshly. The revelation that Susan and Rick are having a baby worsens the situation. After finding out about the baby, Danny stows away in Rick's Chevy Suburban, planning to drop off it en route and visit his father. But while Danny is inside, he sees Rick murdering mysterious stranger Ray Coleman, who earlier attended the wedding unannounced, claiming to be an ex-business associate of Rick.

Danny reports the murder to his father and to the local police. Rick, however, has managed to dispose of most of the evidence, and is widely considered a pillar of the local community as he invested his money in the area, whereas Danny has a history of lying and misdemeanors. Frank believes his son, though, stemming from Rick's notable unease around Ray at the ceremony and the fact that Danny never lies to him.

Frank does some investigating of his own and unearths Rick's criminal past, which now stands to put his son and ex-wife at risk. Frank learns that Rick's true identity is Jack Parnell, a criminal who was acquitted while his partners, Ray among them, were convicted because he framed them all for the crime. Ray had planned to get revenge on Jack by exposing him at the wedding. Jack tries to kill Frank by setting his boathouse on fire, but Frank manages to escape and expose Jack's true identity to the police, who begin heading for Susan's house.

At the house, Susan also realizes the truth when she sees a large burn on Jack's arm, having heard about the fire at the boathouse minutes earlier. She tries to escape with Danny, but Jack knocks her out and takes Danny as a hostage, intending to flee. Frank arrives to confront Jack, and they both engage in a vicious fight, ending when a tied-up Danny pushes Jack into a fuse box, electrocuting and killing him. Susan has no serious physical injury from the conflict, aside from suffering a miscarriage. The police apologize to both Danny and Frank for not believing them about Jack, and the reunited father and son follow Susan as she is taken to the hospital via ambulance.

Cast
John Travolta as Frank Morrison
Vince Vaughn as Rick Barnes/Jack Parnell
Teri Polo as Susan Morrison
Matt O'Leary as Danny Morrison
Steve Buscemi as Ray Coleman
Susan Floyd as Diane
Ruben Santiago-Hudson as Sgt. Edgar Stevens
Chris Ellis as Detective Warren
Angelica Page (appearing as Angelica Torn) as Patty

Production
In April 2001, while shooting the film in Wilmington, North Carolina, actor Steve Buscemi was slashed in the face while intervening in a bar fight between his friend Vince Vaughn, screenwriter Scott Rosenberg and a local man, Timothy Fogerty, who allegedly instigated the brawl.

Release
Paramount Pictures held the world premiere of Domestic Disturbance at the studio on October 30, 2001. The film's stars were in attendance as well as many other guest celebrities. The film was then officially released on November 2, 2001 in 2,910 theaters throughout the United States. It did not prove to be a financial success, grossing only $45,246,095 domestically. By the end of its run, the film was only able to gross $54 million worldwide from its $75 million budget.

Home media
The film was released on DVD on September 3, 2002.

Critical reaction
Domestic Disturbance was received poorly by critics, and gains a 24% rating on Rotten Tomatoes based on 100 reviews, with an average rating of 4/10. The consensus reads: "Well-made but extremely predictable, Domestic Disturbance is an average thriller that may work better on TV." On Metacritic, it holds a score of 29 out of 100, based on reviews from 27 critics, indicating "generally unfavorable reviews".

Roger Ebert awarded it one-and-a-half stars out of a possible four, reciting an anecdote about how the Chicago film critics had been shown the wrong last reel. He saw the correct one the following Monday, and scathingly said of it in his review: "The earlier reel was lacking the final music. Music is the last thing wrong with that reel."

Accolades
Matt O'Leary was nominated for a Young Artist Award, for Best Performance in a Feature Film – Supporting Young Actor. However, star John Travolta was nominated for a Razzie for Worst Actor (also for Swordfish). Vaughn and Travolta later worked in Be Cool together.

References

External links

2001 psychological thriller films
2001 films
American psychological thriller films
Films directed by Harold Becker
Films set in Maryland
Films shot in North Carolina
Paramount Pictures films
Films produced by Donald De Line
Films scored by Mark Mancina
2000s English-language films
2000s American films